Franklin Brooke Voss (1880–1953) was an American painter.

Biography
Franklin Brooke Voss was born in New York City in 1880. He attended the Art Students League of New York, where George Bridgman was his teacher.

He was commissioned paintings by the Whitneys, Riddles, Vanderbilts, Phippses, Wideners, and Willis Sharpe Kilmer. He painted Man o' War, Equipoise, Seabiscuit, War Admiral, Sir Barton and Whirlaway. Some of his work can be found at the Museum of Polo and Hall of Fame in Lake Worth, Florida.

Bibliography
Peter Winants, The Sporting Art of Franklin B. Voss (Eclipse Press, 2005)

References

1880 births
1953 deaths
Painters from New York City
Art Students League of New York alumni
19th-century American painters
19th-century American male artists
American male painters
20th-century American painters
20th-century American male artists